Zane Kirchner (born 16 June 1984) is a South African professional rugby union player. Previously he played at fullback for the Bulls in Super Rugby and the Blue Bulls in the Currie Cup. Born in George, Western Cape, Kirchner attended PW Botha College in his home town, for whom he played at fly-half; he was first selected at fullback for the 2002 Craven Week. He began his provincial rugby career with the Griquas, and made more than 50 appearances for the side between his Currie Cup debut in 2003 and his move to the Blue Bulls in 2007. In five years with the Blue Bulls, Kirchner has made 64 Currie Cup appearances and scored 64 points. He made his debut for the Bulls (Super Rugby) franchise in 2008, and since then he has made a total of 81 appearances and scored 105 points. He won the Currie Cup in 2009 and the Super Rugby title in 2009 and 2010.

In April 2013, it was announced that Kirchner would be leaving the Bulls to join Irish team Leinster on a two-year deal.

On 31 May 2014, Kirchner scored two tries as Leinster won the Pro-12 final to take the 2013–14 title.

On 7 March 2017, Kirchner signed for Welsh region and Pro12 rivals the Dragons ahead of the 2017–18 season.

References

External links

Zane Kirchner on Grundlingh Enslin's Springbok Rugby Hall of Fame
Zane Kirchner on itsrugby.co.uk
Dragons squad

1984 births
Living people
People from George, South Africa
South African rugby union players
South Africa international rugby union players
Rugby union fullbacks
Cape Coloureds
Bulls (rugby union) players
Blue Bulls players
Griquas (rugby union) players
Leinster Rugby players
South African expatriate rugby union players
Expatriate rugby union players in Ireland
South African expatriate sportspeople in Ireland
Dragons RFC players
Rugby union players from the Western Cape